Minnesota State Highway 118 was a highway route number in the U.S. state of Minnesota that was used previously during two different time periods: once during the 1930s and once during the 1990s.

The 1930s route was located in Isanti and Kanabec counties in east-central Minnesota.  The 1990s route was located in the northern suburbs of the Twin Cities in south-central Anoka County and northwest Ramsey County.

1930s Highway 118 route

State Highway 118 was first used on a route that began at its intersection with State Highway 95 near the Rum River in the city of Cambridge and continued north to its northern terminus at its intersection with State Highway 65 in Brunswick Township, near the city of Mora.

Route description
Highway 118 originally served as a shortcut for then-U.S. Route 65, which followed what is now Minnesota State Highway 107 to Grasston, then turned west along what is now Minnesota State Highway 70.

Legally, the highway was defined as Route 189 in the Minnesota Statutes § 161.115(120). It was not marked with this number.

History
The route was authorized April 22, 1933.  This 118 route mostly paralleled nearby Highway 65. When the shortcut on Highway 65 between Braham and Brunswick was constructed in 1941, 118 was rendered obsolete and it was removed in 1943.  Today, this route is signed as Isanti County Road 14 and Kanabec County Road 16.

This was the first state highway decommissioned in Minnesota.

Major intersections

1990s Highway 118 route

References

118
U.S. Route 10